CMD may refer to:

Entities 
 Cable Mágico Deportes, a Peruvian TV network
 Center for Media and Democracy, left-wing nonprofit organization in U.S.
 Center for Molecular Design, Janssen Pharmaceutica
 Coleg Meirion-Dwyfor, a college in Gwynedd, Wales
 Creative Micro Designs, a computer hardware company
 Lakas–CMD, Lakas–Christian Muslim Democrats, a center-right political party in the Philippines

Medical 
 Congenital muscular dystrophy
 Craniomandibular dysfunction
 Custom-made device, a medical device designed and manufactured for the specific use of a particular patient.

Technology 
 cmd.exe, command prompt on the OS/2 and Windows NT families of operating systems
 CMD file (CP/M), the filename extension used by executable programs
 Concerted metalation deprotonation, a kind of chemical reaction

Travel 
 Camden Road railway station, London, England, National Rail code
 Cootamundra Airport, IATA airport code "CMD"

Other 
 Chromo-modal dispersion 
 C.M.D. or Cmd, a Command paper, published by the UK government
 Color-magnitude diagram, a plot of brightness against colour for a group of stars
 Catastrophe à moyens dépassé, "disaster without sufficient rescue means" in French